The 2019 Missouri Tigers baseball team represented the University of Missouri in the 2019 NCAA Division I baseball season. The Tigers played their home games at Taylor Stadium.

NCAA Investigation
On January 31, 2019, the NCAA gave the Tigers a postseason ban for the 2019 season. The Tigers' football and softball teams were also suspended from postseason play. However, due to an ongoing NCAA investigation, the baseball and softball teams will be eligible for postseason in 2019. The NCAA found that a former University of Missouri tutor violated NCAA tules by completing coursework for 12 student athletes in football, baseball, and softball. The tutor or any of the athletes involved in the investigation were not named in the NCAA's report. The tutor received a 10-year show-cause for her involvement in the penalties. The NCAA issued the following penalties:
3 years of probation. 
a 10-year show-cause order for the former tutor. During that period, any NCAA member school employing the tutor must restrict her from any athletically related duties.
a 2018–19 postseason ban for the baseball and softball programs.
a 2019–20 postseason ban for the football program.
a vacation of records in which football, baseball and, softball student-athletes competed while ineligible. The university must provide a written report containing the matches impacted to the NCAA media coordination and statistics staff within 45 days of the public decision release.
a 5 percent reduction in the amount of scholarships in each of the football, baseball, and softball programs during the 2019–20 academic year.
Recruiting restrictions for each of the football, baseball, and softball programs during the 2019–20 academic year, including: A 7-week ban on unofficial visits, A 12.5 percent reduction in official visits, A 7-week ban on recruiting communications, A 7-week ban on all off-campus recruiting contacts and evaluations, A 12.5 percent reduction in recruiting-person or evaluation days.
a disassociation of the tutor. 
a fine of $5,000 plus 1 percent of each of the football, baseball, and softball budgets.

Preseason

Preseason All-American teams

2nd Team
Kameron Misner – Outfielder (Perfect Game)
Kameron Misner – Outfielder (Baseball America)

SEC media poll
The SEC media poll was released on February 7, 2019 with the Tigers predicted to finish last in the Eastern Division.

Roster

Schedule and results

† Indicates the game does not count toward the 2019 Southeastern Conference standings.
*Rankings are based on the team's current ranking in the D1Baseball poll.

Record vs. conference opponents

Rankings

References

Missouri
Missouri Tigers baseball seasons
Missouri Tigers baseball